Promurricia is a monotypic genus of Asian tree trunk spiders containing the single species, Promurricia depressa. It was first described by M. Baehr & B. Baehr in 1993, and has only been found in Sri Lanka.

References

Hersiliidae
Invertebrates of Sri Lanka
Monotypic Araneomorphae genera
Spiders of Asia